The Banarhat High School is a high school situated in Banarhat, Jalpaiguri district, West Bengal, India.

The school is affiliated with the West Bengal Board of Secondary Education, West Bengal Council of Higher Secondary Education and West Bengal State Council of Technical and Vocational Education and Skill Development,  Erstwhile West Bengal State Council of Vocational Education and Training. Banarhat High School educates over 1,200 students in Grades V to XII with Science, Commerce, Humanities and Vocational streams.

History
This is the most famous Bengali medium boys' school in the doors Tea belt and established in the year of 1949. A huge number of students from surrounding tea gardens are very much dependent on this school. The student community of it includes people of different ethnic groups such as Bengali, Nepalese and different tribal groups working in Tea gardens.

See also
Education in India
List of schools in India
Education in West Bengal

References

External links
 West Bengal State Council of Vocational Education &  Training 

Boys' schools in India
High schools and secondary schools in West Bengal
Schools in Jalpaiguri district
Educational institutions established in 1949
1949 establishments in West Bengal